The economy of Guam depends mainly on US military spending and on tourist revenue. Over the past 20 years, the tourist industry grew rapidly, creating a construction boom for new hotels, golf courses and other tourist amenities.  More than 1.1 million tourists visit Guam each year including about 1,000,000 from Japan and 150,000 from Korea. Setbacks in the 1990s include numerous super-typhoons, a M7.8 earthquake, and a Korean airline crash.  

More recently, SARS, the Iraq war and most importantly the Japan economy and accompanying yen-to-dollar adjustments have significantly impacted tourism with spending per person in retail and attraction sectors now nearly 50% compared to their peak in the mid-1990s.  Nevertheless, as of 2005 tourism is finally starting to stabilize and recover.

Most food and industrial goods are imported. As Guam's tourist economy continues to slowly recover, over $1 billion in military spending on the island is projected in the coming several years.   The Government of Guam (GovGuam) is the biggest employer on the island (exceeding the tourism industry and the federal military), with a payroll and retirement burden that has led in recent years to an ongoing and growing budget deficit.

Statistics 

GDP:
purchasing power parity – $5.79 billion (2016 est.) 

GDP – real growth rate:
0.4% 

GDP – per capita:'
$35,600 

purchasing power parity – Uses the US dollarGDP – composition by sector: agriculture: NA%
 industry: NA%
 services: NA%Population below poverty line:23% (2001 est.) Household income or consumption by percentage share: lowest 10%: NA%
 highest 10%: NA%Inflation rate (consumer prices):1% (2017 est.) Labor force:69,390 (Non Military, 2010 est.) Labor force – by occupation:federal and territorial government 31%, private 69% (trade 21%, services 33%, construction 12%, other 3%) (1995)Unemployment rate:4.5% (2017 est.) Budget: revenues: $524.3 million
 expenditures: $361.4 million, including capital expenditures of $NA (1995)Industries:US military, tourism, construction, transshipment services, concrete products, printing and publishing, food processing, textilesIndustrial production growth rate:NA%Electricity – production:1,734 GWh (2011 est.) Electricity – production by source: fossil fuel: 100%
 hydro: 0%
 nuclear: 0%
 other: 0% (1998)Electricity – consumption:1,613 GWh (2011 est.) Electricity – exports:0 kWh (1998)Electricity – imports:0 kWh (1998)Agriculture – products:fruits, copra, vegetables; eggs, pork, poultry, beefExports:$86.1 million (f.o.b., 1992)Exports – commodities:mostly transshipments of refined petroleum products, construction materials, fish, food and beverage productsExports – partners:United States 25%Imports:$202.4 million (c.i.f., 1992)Imports – commodities:petroleum and petroleum products, food, manufactured goodsImports – partners:United States 23%, Japan 19%, other 58%Debt – external:$NAEconomic aid – recipient:$NA; note – although Guam receives no foreign aid, it does receive large transfer payments from the general revenues of the US Federal Treasury into which Guamanian pay no income or excise taxes. Guamanians do however contribute to Social Security and Medicare through FICA taxes.Currency:1 United States dollar (USD) = 100 centsExchange rates:US currency is usedFiscal year:'''
1 October – 30 September

References